Grey's Anatomy: The Video Game is a game developed by Longtail Studios and published by Ubisoft in collaboration with ABC Studios. It was released on March 4, 2009 for Nintendo DS, Wii, and Windows. The game is set during the fourth season of the medical drama Grey's Anatomy in an original storyline in which the doctors have to deal with a diphtheria outbreak. The game takes the form of a visual novel interspersed with minigames.

Gameplay 

The game is split into five episodes, each themselves split into smaller acts and scenes. The player switches character each scene and plays a different minigame, which are either a medical procedure (such as a surgery or changing dressing) or based on controlling emotions, such as "flicking away doubts" or controlling breathing with a rhythm game.

Plot 
The game's main plot revolves around an outbreak of diphtheria at Seattle Grace hospital, forcing the characters to remain in quarantine in the hospital. Each of the main characters also have their own subplots, with Derek and Merediths mostly focusing on their relationship, Christina's being attempting to secure a fellowship and having a new love interest created specifically for the game in Dr. Vince Bennet, Bailey worrying about her new son.

Reception 

The game received an aggregate score of 36/100 for its Windows version from Metacritic, indicating "generally unfavorable reviews", and a 65/100 for the Wii version, indicating "mixed or average reviews".

IGN gave the game 6/10 points, stating that the storyline was "hilariously random much of the time" while the gameplay was "about as challenging as trying to run into a wall". GamesRadar+ gave the game 1.5/5 stars, also citing the simplicity of the minigames and calling it "bizarre".

References 

2009 video games
Grey's Anatomy
Medical video games
Single-player video games
Visual novels
Ubisoft games
Nintendo DS games
Video games based on television series
Video games developed in Canada
Video games featuring female protagonists
Video games set in Seattle
Wii games
Windows games
Works set in hospitals
Puzzle video games